Kees van Buuren (born 27 July 1986) is a retired Dutch footballer who currently played as a right back.

Club career
Van Buuren is a defender who was born in Lopik and made his debut in professional football, being part of the FC Utrecht squad in the 2005–06 season. He was transferred to FC Den Bosch in 2009 and three years later, he joined Willem II. In the summer of 2014, he left on a free transfer to Sparta.

In January 2016, van Buuren left Sparta for Almere City. At the end of the 2018-19 season, van Buuren retired.

Honours

Club
Willem II
Eerste Divisie (1): 2013–14

References

External links
 

1986 births
Living people
People from Lopik
Association football fullbacks
Dutch footballers
FC Utrecht players
FC Den Bosch players
Willem II (football club) players
Sparta Rotterdam players
Almere City FC players
Eredivisie players
Eerste Divisie players
USV Hercules players
Footballers from Utrecht (province)
21st-century Dutch people